Periparus is a genus of birds in the tit family. The birds in the genus were formerly included in Parus but were moved to Periparus when Parus was split into several resurrected genera following the publication of a detailed molecular phylogenetic analysis in 2005. The name Periparus had been introduced for a subgenus of Parus that included the coal tit by the Belgium naturalist Edmond de Sélys Longchamps in 1884. The genus name, is Ancient Greek peri plus the pre-existing genus Parus.

The genus contains the following species:

All occur in Asia; the coal tit also has a wide range in Europe and North Africa.  These birds have white cheeks and most have a tufted head.

References

 Del Hoyo, J.; Elliot, A. & Christie D. (editors). (2007). Handbook of the Birds of the World. Volume 12: Picathartes to Tits and Chickadees. Lynx Edicions. 

 
Paridae
 
Bird genera